Jose Miguel Battle Sr. (September 14, 1929 – August 4, 2007) was a policeman and Cuban exile who served in the unsuccessful Bay of Pigs Invasion to overthrow the communist Cuban regime in 1961. He later became the nominal leader and founder of  The Corporation, also known as the Cuban Mafia, and he invested in the gambling industry in the United States and Peru. He was eventually convicted of racketeering and sentenced to 20 years in prison.

Early life in Cuba
Battle was born on September 14, 1929, in Alto Songo, Cuba. His father was Jose Maria Battle Bestard and his mother, Angela Vargas Yzaguirre. He had five brothers: Gustavo, Pedro, Sergio, Hiram and Aldo. He was educated in Santiago de Cuba.

Battle began his career as a policeman in Santiago de Cuba in 1949, and he was transferred to Havana in the early 1950s. He had been a vice cop, handling cases related to illegal gambling, alcohol, drugs and racketeering and acted as a go-between for the Mafia, as a police seargeant delivering cash bribes from the criminal enterprises of Meyer Lansky to President Fulgencio Batista and his government.  He became a Freemason in Cuba. He emigrated to the United States in December 1959.

Bay of Pigs Invasion
Battle assisted the Central Intelligence Agency in the early 1960s in training Cuban exiles and commanded one of the landing craft in the Cuban liberation effort of the Bay of Pigs Invasion at Playa Girón in April 1961. Battle also served as a soldier in the ground assault.   The invasion result was disastrous after President John F. Kennedy aborted American air support just five minutes before the armed Cubans reached Cuban soil. Jose, along the other surviving expatriate soldiers, was captured after three days of arduous battle and imprisoned for nearly two years in a Cuban prison.

Career
As compensation for his service in the Bay of Pigs Invasion, Battle was given an officer’s commission in the United States Army; he held the rank of second lieutenant in the infantry. He did not earn high enough evaluations to merit promotion to first lieutenant and left the Army after a year. After being released from what many saw as the result of a betrayal from JFK, Battle settled in Union City, New Jersey, and began establishing a presence as the leader of a family of Cuban-American criminals involved in organized crime activities from loansharking and gambling  to drug trafficking and murder. He allegedly established good working relationships with the Italian Mafia in the New York City area, but at other times the corporation is known to have had violent turf wars with various Italian mafia families. He made the bulk of his wealth from an illegal lottery racket known as bolita (little ball), which was popular among expatriate Italians, Cubans and Puerto Ricans. It is estimated that his network was making up to $45 million a year in the 1970s from bolita in New Jersey, New York and Florida. Battles' reputation was such that he was known among the Cuban American community in Miami as El Padrino, or the Godfather.

Battle was convicted in 1977 and sentenced to 30 years in prison in connection with the death of Ernestico Torres, an alleged hit man for Battle's organization. An appeals court overturned the conviction, but Battle later pleaded guilty to murder conspiracy in exchange for a sentence of time served – two years.

By the 1980s Battle had built up an empire of crime and began investing heavily in legitimate businesses throughout the New York area. In the Spanish Harlem area of the city Battle had the Torres brothers Pancho, Enrique and Henry who ran all the numbers and Bolita for him in the uptown part of the city. The Torres brothers had a family affair using Pancho Torres' son in law Jose Castro and also his son Kiko Jr. to run the Bolita operation throughout the bodegas in the Harlem and South Bronx sections of the city.

In the late 1980s, President Ronald Reagan's Select Committee on Organized Crime investigated the Corporation and estimated its membership, direct or loosely associated, at 2,500 members. Soon afterwards, Battle expanded to Miami, Florida, where there was a large population of Cuban immigrants and began to operate his East Coast empire from the Little Havana area of the city. In 1987 Battle was listed as one of Dade County's wealthiest men with a net worth of $175 million.

In the early 1990s Battle Sr. fled to Lima, Peru, where he opened a casino in the Hotel Crillón. He eventually moved back to his $1.5 million Florida ranch, El Zapotal, in Homestead, Florida, south of Miami. The corporation was making hundreds of millions from gambling, racketeering, illegal lottery and loan sharking, and operated in the US, Central- and South America, the Caribbean, and Europe.

Arrest, conviction and death
In 2004 Battle Sr, his son Jr., and 21 other key aid members and associates were indicted and charged with five murders, four arson attacks resulting in eight deaths, and more than $1.5 billion collected from drug trafficking, bookmaking, and numbers rackets. Of the 21, four were arrested in the New York and Union City, N.J. areas. One was in Puerto Rico and another in Spain; the rest were in the Miami area, including Battle's son. He was housed in the Metropolitan Correctional Center (MCC) in Miami on more charges of racketeering. Battle Jr and associate Julio Acuña attempted to appeal the decision but failed, with Battle Jr sentenced to more than 15 years in federal prison and ordered to forfeit $642 million and Acuña sentenced to life and a $1.4 billion judgment.

On May 6, 2006, Battle pleaded guilty to the racketeering charges due to his health. On January 15, 2007, he was sentenced to 20 years in prison. On August 6, 2007 he died from various ailments in a South Carolina medical facility while in Federal Custody awaiting transfer to another prison. He was 77.

Legacy
In April 2016, Paramount Pictures and The Picture Company will develop a biopic based on T.J. English's The Corporation with Benicio del Toro attached to play Battle Sr.

References

1930 births
2007 deaths
Cuban gangsters
People from Havana
Cuban emigrants to the United States
People from Union City, New Jersey
Hispanic and Latino American gangsters
American crime bosses
American drug traffickers
People convicted of racketeering
American people who died in prison custody
Prisoners who died in United States federal government detention